Nototrechus unicolor is a species of beetle in the family Carabidae, the only species in the genus Nototrechus.

References

Trechinae